Bold Pilot (April 21, 1993 – April 30, 2015) was a Turkish thoroughbred racehorse. He was sired by Persian Bold and owned by Özdemir Atman. As a three-year-old, he won 8 of the 9 races he entered including the Gazi Race. He set a track record in the 1996 edition of the race, recording a time of 2.26.22. In total, he won 16 of the 21 races he entered. Bold Pilot died on 30 April 2015 in Istanbul.

Pedigree

References

External links
 TJK.ORG | HATA

Thoroughbred family 4-l
1993 racehorse births
2015 racehorse deaths
Racehorses bred in Turkey
Racehorses trained in Turkey